FBM may refer to:

 Board foot, a unit of measure for lumber
 Fleet Ballistic Missile, of the United States Navy
 Fractional Brownian motion (fBm)
 Frankfurt Book Fair (Frankfurter Buchmesse), a book trade fair in Frankfurt, Germany
 Lubumbashi International Airport (IATA: FBMI), Democratic Republic of the Congo